Abu Sayeed Md. Shahadat Hussain(8 December 1955 - 30 May 2020), commonly known as Muhaddis  Abu Sayeed was a Bangladesh Jamaat-e-Islami politician and the former Member of Parliament of Jessore-2. He was a Muhaddis, an islamic speaker and scholar. He had a deep knowledge of Quran, Hadith, Fiqh, Usul al-Fiqh.

Career
Muhaddis Abu Sayeed was elected to parliament from Jessore-2 as a Bangladesh Jamaat-e-Islami candidate in 2001.

Death 
Muhaddis Abu Sayeed died of a heart attack on 30 May 2020.

References

Bangladesh Jamaat-e-Islami politicians
8th Jatiya Sangsad members
People from Jessore District
1955 births
2020 deaths